Australoberis is a genus of flies in the family Stratiomyidae.

Species
Australoberis amoena Lindner, 1958
Australoberis refugians (Miller, 1917)

References

Stratiomyidae
Brachycera genera
Taxa named by Erwin Lindner
Diptera of Australasia